Wood is a structural tissue found in the stems and roots of trees and other woody plants. It is an organic materiala natural composite of cellulose fibers that are strong in tension and embedded in a matrix of lignin that resists compression. Wood is sometimes defined as only the secondary xylem in the stems of trees, or it is defined more broadly to include the same type of tissue elsewhere such as in the roots of trees or shrubs. In a living tree it performs a support function, enabling woody plants to grow large or to stand up by themselves. It also conveys water and nutrients between the leaves, other growing tissues, and the roots. Wood may also refer to other plant materials with comparable properties, and to material engineered from wood, or woodchips or fiber.

Wood has been used for thousands of years for fuel, as a construction material, for making tools and weapons, furniture and paper. More recently it emerged as a feedstock for the production of purified cellulose and its derivatives, such as cellophane and cellulose acetate.

As of 2020, the growing stock of forests worldwide was about 557 billion cubic meters. As an abundant, carbon-neutral renewable resource, woody materials have been of intense interest as a source of renewable energy. In 2008, approximately 3.97 billion cubic meters of wood were harvested. Dominant uses were for furniture and building construction.

History

A 2011 discovery in the Canadian province of New Brunswick yielded the earliest known plants to have grown wood, approximately 395 to 400 million years ago.

Wood can be dated by carbon dating and in some species by dendrochronology to determine when a wooden object was created.

People have used wood for thousands of years for many purposes, including as a fuel or as a construction material for making houses, tools, weapons, furniture, packaging, artworks, and paper. Known constructions using wood date back ten thousand years. Buildings like the European Neolithic long house were made primarily of wood.

Recent use of wood has been enhanced by the addition of steel and bronze into construction.

The year-to-year variation in tree-ring widths and isotopic abundances gives clues to the prevailing climate at the time a tree was cut.

Physical properties

Growth rings

Wood, in the strict sense, is yielded by trees, which increase in diameter by the formation, between the existing wood and the inner bark, of new woody layers which envelop the entire stem, living branches, and roots. This process is known as secondary growth; it is the result of cell division in the vascular cambium, a lateral meristem, and subsequent expansion of the new cells. These cells then go on to form thickened secondary cell walls, composed mainly of cellulose, hemicellulose and lignin.

Where the differences between the seasons are distinct, e.g. New Zealand, growth can occur in a discrete annual or seasonal pattern, leading to growth rings; these can usually be most clearly seen on the end of a log, but are also visible on the other surfaces. If the distinctiveness between seasons is annual (as is the case in equatorial regions, e.g. Singapore), these growth rings are referred to as annual rings. Where there is little seasonal difference growth rings are likely to be indistinct or absent.  If the bark of the tree has been removed in a particular area, the rings will likely be deformed as the plant overgrows the scar.

If there are differences within a growth ring, then the part of a growth ring nearest the center of the tree, and formed early in the growing season when growth is rapid, is usually composed of wider elements. It is usually lighter in color than that near the outer portion of the ring, and is known as earlywood or springwood. The outer portion formed later in the season is then known as the latewood or summerwood. There are major differences, depending on the kind of wood. If a tree grows all its life in the open and the conditions of soil and site remain unchanged, it will make its most rapid growth in youth, and gradually decline. The annual rings of growth are for many years quite wide, but later they become narrower and narrower. Since each succeeding ring is laid down on the outside of the wood previously formed, it follows that unless a tree materially increases its production of wood from year to year, the rings must necessarily become thinner as the trunk gets wider. As a tree reaches maturity its crown becomes more open and the annual wood production is lessened, thereby reducing still more the width of the growth rings. In the case of forest-grown trees so much depends upon the competition of the trees in their struggle for light and nourishment that periods of rapid and slow growth may alternate. Some trees, such as southern oaks, maintain the same width of ring for hundreds of years. On the whole, as a tree gets larger in diameter the width of the growth rings decreases.

Knots

As a tree grows, lower branches often die, and their bases may become overgrown and enclosed by subsequent layers of trunk wood, forming a type of imperfection known as a knot. The dead branch may not be attached to the trunk wood except at its base, and can drop out after the tree has been sawn into boards. Knots affect the technical properties of the wood, usually reducing tension strength, but may be exploited for visual effect. In a longitudinally sawn plank, a knot will appear as a roughly circular "solid" (usually darker) piece of wood around which the grain of the rest of the wood "flows" (parts and rejoins). Within a knot, the direction of the wood (grain direction) is up to 90 degrees different from the grain direction of the regular wood.

In the tree a knot is either the base of a side branch or a dormant bud. A knot (when the base of a side branch) is conical in shape (hence the roughly circular cross-section) with the inner tip at the point in stem diameter at which the plant's vascular cambium was located when the branch formed as a bud.

In grading lumber and structural timber, knots are classified according to their form, size, soundness, and the firmness with which they are held in place. This firmness is affected by, among other factors, the length of time for which the branch was dead while the attaching stem continued to grow.

Knots do not necessarily influence the stiffness of structural timber, this will depend on the size and location. Stiffness and elastic strength are more dependent upon the sound wood than upon localized defects. The breaking strength is very susceptible to defects. Sound knots do not weaken wood when subject to compression parallel to the grain.

In some decorative applications, wood with knots may be desirable to add visual interest. In applications where wood is painted, such as skirting boards, fascia boards, door frames and furniture, resins present in the timber may continue to 'bleed' through to the surface of a knot for months or even years after manufacture and show as a yellow or brownish stain. A knot primer paint or solution (knotting), correctly applied during preparation, may do much to reduce this problem but it is difficult to control completely, especially when using mass-produced kiln-dried timber stocks.

Hearts and sap

Heartwood (or duramen) is wood that as a result of a naturally occurring chemical transformation has become more resistant to decay. Heartwood formation is a genetically programmed process that occurs spontaneously. Some uncertainty exists as to whether the wood dies during heartwood formation, as it can still chemically react to decay organisms, but only once.

The term heartwood derives solely from its position and not from any vital importance to the tree. This is evidenced by the fact that a tree can thrive with its heart completely decayed. Some species begin to form heartwood very early in life, so having only a thin layer of live sapwood, while in others the change comes slowly. Thin sapwood is characteristic of such species as chestnut, black locust, mulberry, osage-orange, and sassafras, while in maple, ash, hickory, hackberry, beech, and pine, thick sapwood is the rule. Some others never form heartwood.

Heartwood is often visually distinct from the living sapwood, and can be distinguished in a cross-section where the boundary will tend to follow the growth rings. For example, it is sometimes much darker. Other processes such as decay or insect invasion can also discolor wood, even in woody plants that do not form heartwood, which may lead to confusion.

Sapwood (or alburnum) is the younger, outermost wood; in the growing tree it is living wood, and its principal functions are to conduct water from the roots to the leaves and to store up and give back according to the season the reserves prepared in the leaves. By the time they become competent to conduct water, all xylem tracheids and vessels have lost their cytoplasm and the cells are therefore functionally dead. All wood in a tree is first formed as sapwood. The more leaves a tree bears and the more vigorous its growth, the larger the volume of sapwood required. Hence trees making rapid growth in the open have thicker sapwood for their size than trees of the same species growing in dense forests. Sometimes trees (of species that do form heartwood) grown in the open may become of considerable size,  or more in diameter, before any heartwood begins to form, for example, in second-growth hickory, or open-grown pines.

No definite relation exists between the annual rings of growth and the amount of sapwood. Within the same species the cross-sectional area of the sapwood is very roughly proportional to the size of the crown of the tree. If the rings are narrow, more of them are required than where they are wide. As the tree gets larger, the sapwood must necessarily become thinner or increase materially in volume. Sapwood is relatively thicker in the upper portion of the trunk of a tree than near the base, because the age and the diameter of the upper sections are less.

When a tree is very young it is covered with limbs almost, if not entirely, to the ground, but as it grows older some or all of them will eventually die and are either broken off or fall off. Subsequent growth of wood may completely conceal the stubs which will remain as knots. No matter how smooth and clear a log is on the outside, it is more or less knotty near the middle. Consequently, the sapwood of an old tree, and particularly of a forest-grown tree, will be freer from knots than the inner heartwood. Since in most uses of wood, knots are defects that weaken the timber and interfere with its ease of working and other properties, it follows that a given piece of sapwood, because of its position in the tree, may well be stronger than a piece of heartwood from the same tree.

Different pieces of wood cut from a large tree may differ decidedly, particularly if the tree is big and mature. In some trees, the wood laid on late in the life of a tree is softer, lighter, weaker, and more even-textured than that produced earlier, but in other trees, the reverse applies. This may or may not correspond to heartwood and sapwood. In a large log the sapwood, because of the time in the life of the tree when it was grown, may be inferior in hardness, strength, and toughness to equally sound heartwood from the same log. In a smaller tree, the reverse may be true.

Color

In species which show a distinct difference between heartwood and sapwood the natural color of heartwood is usually darker than that of the sapwood, and very frequently the contrast is conspicuous (see section of yew log above). This is produced by deposits in the heartwood of chemical substances, so that a dramatic color variation does not imply a significant difference in the mechanical properties of heartwood and sapwood, although there may be a marked biochemical difference between the two.

Some experiments on very resinous longleaf pine specimens indicate an increase in strength, due to the resin which increases the strength when dry. Such resin-saturated heartwood is called "fat lighter". Structures built of fat lighter are almost impervious to rot and termites, and very flammable. Tree stumps of old longleaf pines are often dug, split into small pieces and sold as kindling for fires. Stumps thus dug may actually remain a century or more since being cut. Spruce impregnated with crude resin and dried is also greatly increased in strength thereby.

Since the latewood of a growth ring is usually darker in color than the earlywood, this fact may be used in visually judging the density, and therefore the hardness and strength of the material. This is particularly the case with coniferous woods. In ring-porous woods the vessels of the early wood often appear on a finished surface as darker than the denser latewood, though on cross sections of heartwood the reverse is commonly true. Otherwise the color of wood is no indication of strength.

Abnormal discoloration of wood often denotes a diseased condition, indicating unsoundness. The black check in western hemlock is the result of insect attacks. The reddish-brown streaks so common in hickory and certain other woods are mostly the result of injury by birds. The discoloration is merely an indication of an injury, and in all probability does not of itself affect the properties of the wood. Certain rot-producing fungi impart to wood characteristic colors which thus become symptomatic of weakness. Ordinary sap-staining is due to fungal growth, but does not necessarily produce a weakening effect.

Water content
Water occurs in living wood in three locations, namely:
 in the cell walls,
 in the protoplasmic contents of the cells
 as free water in the cell cavities and spaces, especially of the xylem

In heartwood it occurs only in the first and last forms. Wood that is thoroughly air-dried retains 8–16% of the water in the cell walls, and none, or practically none, in the other forms. Even oven-dried wood retains a small percentage of moisture, but for all except chemical purposes, may be considered absolutely dry.

The general effect of the water content upon the wood substance is to render it softer and more pliable. A similar effect occurs in the softening action of water on rawhide, paper, or cloth. Within certain limits, the greater the water content, the greater its softening effect.

Drying produces a decided increase in the strength of wood, particularly in small specimens. An extreme example is the case of a completely dry spruce block 5 cm in section, which will sustain a permanent load four times as great as a green (undried) block of the same size will.

The greatest strength increase due to drying is in the ultimate crushing strength, and strength at elastic limit in endwise compression; these are followed by the modulus of rupture, and stress at elastic limit in cross-bending, while the modulus of elasticity is least affected.

Structure

Wood is a heterogeneous, hygroscopic, cellular and anisotropic material. It consists of cells, and the cell walls are composed of micro-fibrils of cellulose (40–50%) and hemicellulose (15–25%) impregnated with lignin (15–30%).

In coniferous or softwood species the wood cells are mostly of one kind, tracheids, and as a result the material is much more uniform in structure than that of most hardwoods. There are no vessels ("pores") in coniferous wood such as one sees so prominently in oak and ash, for example.

The structure of hardwoods is more complex. The water conducting capability is mostly taken care of by vessels: in some cases (oak, chestnut, ash) these are quite large and distinct, in others (buckeye, poplar, willow) too small to be seen without a hand lens. In discussing such woods it is customary to divide them into two large classes, ring-porous and diffuse-porous.

In ring-porous species, such as ash, black locust, catalpa, chestnut, elm, hickory, mulberry, and oak, the larger vessels or pores (as cross sections of vessels are called) are localized in the part of the growth ring formed in spring, thus forming a region of more or less open and porous tissue. The rest of the ring, produced in summer, is made up of smaller vessels and a much greater proportion of wood fibers. These fibers are the elements which give strength and toughness to wood, while the vessels are a source of weakness.

In diffuse-porous woods the pores are evenly sized so that the water conducting capability is scattered throughout the growth ring instead of being collected in a band or row. Examples of this kind of wood are alder, basswood, birch, buckeye, maple, willow, and the Populus species such as aspen, cottonwood and poplar. Some species, such as walnut and cherry, are on the border between the two classes, forming an intermediate group.

Earliness and lateness

Softwood

In temperate softwoods, there often is a marked difference between latewood and earlywood. The latewood will be denser than that formed early in the season. When examined under a microscope, the cells of dense latewood are seen to be very thick-walled and with very small cell cavities, while those formed first in the season have thin walls and large cell cavities. The strength is in the walls, not the cavities. Hence the greater the proportion of latewood, the greater the density and strength. In choosing a piece of pine where strength or stiffness is the important consideration, the principal thing to observe is the comparative amounts of earlywood and latewood. The width of ring is not nearly so important as the proportion and nature of the latewood in the ring.

If a heavy piece of pine is compared with a lightweight piece it will be seen at once that the heavier one contains a larger proportion of latewood than the other, and is therefore showing more clearly demarcated growth rings. In white pines there is not much contrast between the different parts of the ring, and as a result the wood is very uniform in texture and is easy to work. In hard pines, on the other hand, the latewood is very dense and is deep-colored, presenting a very decided contrast to the soft, straw-colored earlywood.

It is not only the proportion of latewood, but also its quality, that counts. In specimens that show a very large proportion of latewood it may be noticeably more porous and weigh considerably less than the latewood in pieces that contain less latewood. One can judge comparative density, and therefore to some extent strength, by visual inspection.

No satisfactory explanation can as yet be given for the exact mechanisms determining the formation of earlywood and latewood. Several factors may be involved. In conifers, at least, rate of growth alone does not determine the proportion of the two portions of the ring, for in some cases the wood of slow growth is very hard and heavy, while in others the opposite is true. The quality of the site where the tree grows undoubtedly affects the character of the wood formed, though it is not possible to formulate a rule governing it. In general, where strength or ease of working is essential, woods of moderate to slow growth should be chosen.

Ring-porous woods

In ring-porous woods, each season's growth is always well defined, because the large pores formed early in the season abut on the denser tissue of the year before.

In the case of the ring-porous hardwoods, there seems to exist a pretty definite relation between the rate of growth of timber and its properties. This may be briefly summed up in the general statement that the more rapid the growth or the wider the rings of growth, the heavier, harder, stronger, and stiffer the wood. This, it must be remembered, applies only to ring-porous woods such as oak, ash, hickory, and others of the same group, and is, of course, subject to some exceptions and limitations.

In ring-porous woods of good growth, it is usually the latewood in which the thick-walled, strength-giving fibers are most abundant. As the breadth of ring diminishes, this latewood is reduced so that very slow growth produces comparatively light, porous wood composed of thin-walled vessels and wood parenchyma. In good oak, these large vessels of the earlywood occupy from six to ten percent of the volume of the log, while in inferior material they may make up 25% or more. The latewood of good oak is dark colored and firm, and consists mostly of thick-walled fibers which form one-half or more of the wood. In inferior oak, this latewood is much reduced both in quantity and quality. Such variation is very largely the result of rate of growth.

Wide-ringed wood is often called "second-growth", because the growth of the young timber in open stands after the old trees have been removed is more rapid than in trees in a closed forest, and in the manufacture of articles where strength is an important consideration such "second-growth" hardwood material is preferred. This is particularly the case in the choice of hickory for handles and spokes. Here not only strength, but toughness and resilience are important.

The results of a series of tests on hickory by the U.S. Forest Service show that:
"The work or shock-resisting ability is greatest in wide-ringed wood that has from 5 to 14 rings per inch (rings 1.8-5 mm thick), is fairly constant from 14 to 38 rings per inch (rings 0.7–1.8 mm thick), and decreases rapidly from 38 to 47 rings per inch (rings 0.5–0.7 mm thick). The strength at maximum load is not so great with the most rapid-growing wood; it is maximum with from 14 to 20 rings per inch (rings 1.3–1.8 mm thick), and again becomes less as the wood becomes more closely ringed. The natural deduction is that wood of first-class mechanical value shows from 5 to 20 rings per inch (rings 1.3–5 mm thick) and that slower growth yields poorer stock. Thus the inspector or buyer of hickory should discriminate against timber that has more than 20 rings per inch (rings less than 1.3 mm thick). Exceptions exist, however, in the case of normal growth upon dry situations, in which the slow-growing material may be strong and tough."

The effect of rate of growth on the qualities of chestnut wood is summarized by the same authority as follows:

"When the rings are wide, the transition from spring wood to summer wood is gradual, while in the narrow rings the spring wood passes into summer wood abruptly. The width of the spring wood changes but little with the width of the annual ring, so that the narrowing or broadening of the annual ring is always at the expense of the summer wood. The narrow vessels of the summer wood make it richer in wood substance than the spring wood composed of wide vessels. Therefore, rapid-growing specimens with wide rings have more wood substance than slow-growing trees with narrow rings. Since the more the wood substance the greater the weight, and the greater the weight the stronger the wood, chestnuts with wide rings must have stronger wood than chestnuts with narrow rings. This agrees with the accepted view that sprouts (which always have wide rings) yield better and stronger wood than seedling chestnuts, which grow more slowly in diameter."

Diffuse-porous woods
In the diffuse-porous woods, the demarcation between rings is not always so clear and in some cases is almost (if not entirely) invisible to the unaided eye. Conversely, when there is a clear demarcation there may not be a noticeable difference in structure within the growth ring.

In diffuse-porous woods, as has been stated, the vessels or pores are even-sized, so that the water conducting capability is scattered throughout the ring instead of collected in the earlywood. The effect of rate of growth is, therefore, not the same as in the ring-porous woods, approaching more nearly the conditions in the conifers. In general, it may be stated that such woods of medium growth afford stronger material than when very rapidly or very slowly grown. In many uses of wood, total strength is not the main consideration. If ease of working is prized, wood should be chosen with regard to its uniformity of texture and straightness of grain, which will in most cases occur when there is little contrast between the latewood of one season's growth and the earlywood of the next.

Monocots

Structural material that resembles ordinary, "dicot" or conifer timber in its gross handling characteristics is produced by a number of monocot plants, and these also are colloquially called wood. Of these, bamboo, botanically a member of the grass family, has considerable economic importance, larger culms being widely used as a building and construction material and in the manufacture of engineered flooring, panels and veneer. Another major plant group that produces material that often is called wood are the palms. Of much less importance are plants such as Pandanus, Dracaena and Cordyline. With all this material, the structure and composition of the processed raw material is quite different from ordinary wood.

Specific gravity
The single most revealing property of wood as an indicator of wood quality is specific gravity (Timell 1986), as both pulp yield and lumber strength are determined by it. Specific gravity is the ratio of the mass of a substance to the mass of an equal volume of water; density is the ratio of a mass of a quantity of a substance to the volume of that quantity and is expressed in mass per unit substance, e.g., grams per milliliter (g/cm3 or g/ml). The terms are essentially equivalent as long as the metric system is used. Upon drying, wood shrinks and its density increases. Minimum values are associated with green (water-saturated) wood and are referred to as basic specific gravity (Timell 1986).

Density

Wood density is determined by multiple growth and physiological factors compounded into “one fairly easily measured wood characteristic” (Elliott 1970).

Age, diameter, height, radial (trunk) growth, geographical location, site and growing conditions, silvicultural treatment, and seed source all to some degree influence wood density. Variation is to be expected. Within an individual tree, the variation in wood density is often as great as or even greater than that between different trees (Timell 1986). Variation of specific gravity within the bole of a tree can occur in either the horizontal or vertical direction.

Tables
The following tables list the mechanical properties of wood and lumber plant species, including bamboo.

Wood properties:

Bamboo properties:

Hard versus soft

It is common to classify wood as either softwood or hardwood. The wood from conifers (e.g. pine) is called softwood, and the wood from dicotyledons (usually broad-leaved trees, e.g. oak) is called hardwood. These names are a bit misleading, as hardwoods are not necessarily hard, and softwoods are not necessarily soft. The well-known balsa (a hardwood) is actually softer than any commercial softwood. Conversely, some softwoods (e.g. yew) are harder than many hardwoods.

There is a strong relationship between the properties of wood and the properties of the particular tree that yielded it, at least for certain species. For example, in loblolly pine, wind exposure and stem position greatly affect the hardness of wood, as well as compression wood content. The density of wood varies with species. The density of a wood correlates with its strength (mechanical properties). For example, mahogany is a medium-dense hardwood that is excellent for fine furniture crafting, whereas balsa is light, making it useful for model building. One of the densest woods is black ironwood.

Chemistry

The chemical composition of wood varies from species to species, but is approximately 50% carbon, 42% oxygen, 6% hydrogen, 1% nitrogen, and 1% other elements (mainly calcium, potassium, sodium, magnesium, iron, and manganese) by weight. Wood also contains sulfur, chlorine, silicon, phosphorus, and other elements in small quantity.

Aside from water, wood has three main components. Cellulose, a crystalline polymer derived from glucose, constitutes about 41–43%. Next in abundance is hemicellulose, which is around 20% in deciduous trees but near 30% in conifers. It is mainly five-carbon sugars that are linked in an irregular manner, in contrast to the cellulose. Lignin is the third component at around 27% in coniferous wood vs. 23% in deciduous trees. Lignin confers the hydrophobic properties reflecting the fact that it is based on aromatic rings. These three components are interwoven, and direct covalent linkages exist between the lignin and the hemicellulose. A major focus of the paper industry is the separation of the lignin from the cellulose, from which paper is made.

In chemical terms, the difference between hardwood and softwood is reflected in the composition of the constituent lignin. Hardwood lignin is primarily derived from sinapyl alcohol and coniferyl alcohol. Softwood lignin is mainly derived from coniferyl alcohol.

Extractives
Aside from the structural polymers, i.e. cellulose, hemicellulose and lignin (lignocellulose), wood contains a large variety of non-structural constituents, composed of low molecular weight organic compounds, called extractives. These compounds are present in the extracellular space and can be extracted from the wood using different neutral solvents, such as acetone. Analogous content is present in the so-called exudate produced by trees in response to mechanical damage or after being attacked by insects or fungi. Unlike the structural constituents, the composition of extractives varies over wide ranges and depends on many factors. The amount and composition of extractives differs between tree species, various parts of the same tree, and depends on genetic factors and growth conditions, such as climate and geography. For example, slower growing trees and higher parts of trees have higher content of extractives. Generally, the softwood is richer in extractives than the hardwood. Their concentration increases from the cambium to the pith. Barks and branches also contain extractives. Although extractives represent a small fraction of the wood content, usually less than 10%, they are extraordinarily diverse and thus characterize the chemistry of the wood species. Most extractives are secondary metabolites and some of them serve as precursors to other chemicals. Wood extractives display different activities, some of them are produced in response to wounds, and some of them participate in natural defense against insects and fungi.

These compounds contribute to various physical and chemical properties of the wood, such as wood color, fragnance, durability, acoustic properties, hygroscopicity, adhesion, and drying. Considering these impacts, wood extractives also affect the properties of pulp and paper, and importantly cause many problems in paper industry. Some extractives are surface-active substances and unavoidably affect the surface properties of paper, such as water adsorption, friction and strength. Lipophilic extractives often give rise to sticky deposits during kraft pulping and may leave spots on paper. Extractives also account for paper smell, which is important when making food contact materials.

Most wood extractives are lipophilic and only a little part is water-soluble. The lipophilic portion of extractives, which is collectively referred as wood resin, contains fats and fatty acids, sterols and steryl esters, terpenes, terpenoids, resin acids, and waxes. The heating of resin, i.e. distillation, vaporizes the volatile terpenes and leaves the solid component – rosin. The concentrated liquid of volatile compounds extracted during steam distillation is called essential oil. Distillation of oleoresin obtained from many pines provides rosin and turpentine.

Most extractives can be categorized into three groups: aliphatic compounds, terpenes and phenolic compounds. The latter are more water-soluble and usually are absent in the resin.
Aliphatic compounds include fatty acids, fatty alcohols and their esters with glycerol, fatty alcohols (waxes) and sterols (steryl esters). Hydrocarbons, such as alkanes, are also present in the wood. Suberin is a polyester, made of suberin acids and glycerol, mainly found in barks. Fats serve as a source of energy for the wood cells. The most common wood sterol is sitosterol, and less commonly sitostanol, citrostadienol, campesterol or cholesterol.
The main terpenes occurring in the softwood include mono-, sesqui- and diterpenes. Meanwhile, the terpene composition of the hardwood is considerably different, consisting of triterpenoids, polyprenols and other higher terpenes. Examples of mono-, di- and sesquiterpenes are α- and β-pinenes, 3-carene, β-myrcene, limonene, thujaplicins, α- and β-phellandrenes, α-muurolene, δ-cadinene, α- and δ-cadinols, α- and β-cedrenes, juniperol, longifolene, cis-abienol, borneol, pinifolic acid, nootkatin, chanootin, phytol, geranyl-linalool, β-epimanool, manoyloxide, pimaral and pimarol. Resin acids are usually tricyclic terpenoids, examples of which are pimaric acid, sandaracopimaric acid, isopimaric acid, abietic acid, levopimaric acid, palustric acid, neoabietic acid and dehydroabietic acid. Bicyclic resin acids are also found, such as lambertianic acid, communic acid, mercusic acid and secodehydroabietic acid. Cycloartenol, betulin and squalene are triterpenoids purified from hardwood. Examples of wood polyterpenes are rubber (cis-polypren), gutta percha (trans-polypren), gutta-balatá (trans-polypren) and betulaprenols (acyclic polyterpenoids). The mono- and sesquiterpenes of the softwood are responsible for the typical smell of pine forest. Many monoterpenoids, such as β-myrcene, are used in the preparation of flavors and fragrances. Tropolones, such as hinokitiol and other thujaplicins, are present in decay-resistant trees and display fungicidal and insecticidal properties. Tropolones strongly bind metal ions and can cause digester corrosion in the process kraft pulping. Owing to their metal-binding and ionophoric properties, especially thujaplicins are used in physiology experiments. Different other in-vitro biological activities of thujaplicins have been studied, such as insecticidal, anti-browning, anti-viral, anti-bacterial, anti-fungal, anti-proliferative and anti-oxidant.
Phenolic compounds are especially found in the hardwood and the bark. The most well-known wood phenolic constituents are stilbenes (e.g. pinosylvin), lignans (e.g. pinoresinol, conidendrin, plicatic acid, hydroxymatairesinol), norlignans (e.g. nyasol, puerosides A and B, hydroxysugiresinol, sequirin-C), tannins (e.g. gallic acid, ellagic acid), flavonoids (e.g. chrysin, taxifolin, catechin, genistein). Most of the phenolic compounds have fungicidal properties and protect the wood from fungal decay. Together with the neolignans the phenolic compounds influence on the color of the wood. Resin acids and phenolic compounds are the main toxic contaminants present in the untreated effluents from pulping. Polyphenolic compounds are one of the most abundant biomolecules produced by plants, such as flavonoids and tannins. Tannins are used in leather industry and have shown to exhibit different biological activities. Flavonoids are very diverse, widely distributed in the plant kingdom and have numerous biological activities and roles.

Uses

Fuel

Wood has a long history of being used as fuel, which continues to this day, mostly in rural areas of the world. Hardwood is preferred over softwood because it creates less smoke and burns longer. Adding a woodstove or fireplace to a home is often felt to add ambiance and warmth.

Pulpwood
Pulpwood is wood that is raised specifically for use in making paper.

Construction

Wood has been an important construction material since humans began building shelters, houses and boats. Nearly all boats were made out of wood until the late 19th century, and wood remains in common use today in boat construction. Elm in particular was used for this purpose as it resisted decay as long as it was kept wet (it also served for water pipe before the advent of more modern plumbing).

Wood to be used for construction work is commonly known as lumber in North America. Elsewhere, lumber usually refers to felled trees, and the word for sawn planks ready for use is timber. In Medieval Europe oak was the wood of choice for all wood construction, including beams, walls, doors, and floors. Today a wider variety of woods is used: solid wood doors are often made from poplar, small-knotted pine, and Douglas fir.

New domestic housing in many parts of the world today is commonly made from timber-framed construction. Engineered wood products are becoming a bigger part of the construction industry. They may be used in both residential and commercial buildings as structural and aesthetic materials.

In buildings made of other materials, wood will still be found as a supporting material, especially in roof construction, in interior doors and their frames, and as exterior cladding.

Wood is also commonly used as shuttering material to form the mold into which concrete is poured during reinforced concrete construction.

Flooring

A solid wood floor is a floor laid with planks or battens created from a single piece of timber, usually a hardwood. Since wood is hydroscopic (it acquires and loses moisture from the ambient conditions around it) this potential instability effectively limits the length and width of the boards.

Solid hardwood flooring is usually cheaper than engineered timbers and damaged areas can be sanded down and refinished repeatedly, the number of times being limited only by the thickness of wood above the tongue.

Solid hardwood floors were originally used for structural purposes, being installed perpendicular to the wooden support beams of a building (the joists or bearers) and solid construction timber is still often used for sports floors as well as most traditional wood blocks, mosaics and parquetry.

Engineered products

Engineered wood products, glued building products "engineered" for application-specific performance requirements, are often used in construction and industrial applications. Glued engineered wood products are manufactured by bonding together wood strands, veneers, lumber or other forms of wood fiber with glue to form a larger, more efficient composite structural unit.

These products include glued laminated timber (glulam), wood structural panels (including plywood, oriented strand board and composite panels), laminated veneer lumber (LVL) and other structural composite lumber (SCL) products, parallel strand lumber, and I-joists. Approximately 100 million cubic meters of wood was consumed for this purpose in 1991. The trends suggest that particle board and fiber board will overtake plywood.

Wood unsuitable for construction in its native form may be broken down mechanically (into fibers or chips) or chemically (into cellulose) and used as a raw material for other building materials, such as engineered wood, as well as chipboard, hardboard, and medium-density fiberboard (MDF). Such wood derivatives are widely used: wood fibers are an important component of most paper, and cellulose is used as a component of some synthetic materials. Wood derivatives can be used for kinds of flooring, for example laminate flooring.

Furniture and utensils
Wood has always been used extensively for furniture, such as chairs and beds. It is also used for tool handles and cutlery, such as chopsticks, toothpicks, and other utensils, like the wooden spoon and pencil.

Other
Further developments include new lignin glue applications, recyclable food packaging, rubber tire replacement applications, anti-bacterial medical agents, and high strength fabrics or composites.
As scientists and engineers further learn and develop new techniques to extract various components from wood, or alternatively to modify wood, for example by adding components to wood, new more advanced products will appear on the marketplace. Moisture content electronic monitoring can also enhance next generation wood protection.

Art

Wood has long been used as an artistic medium. It has been used to make sculptures and carvings for millennia. Examples include the totem poles carved by North American indigenous people from conifer trunks, often Western Red Cedar (Thuja plicata).

Other uses of wood in the arts include:
 Woodcut printmaking and engraving
 Wood can be a surface to paint on, such as in panel painting
 Many musical instruments are made mostly or entirely of wood

Sports and recreational equipment
Many types of sports equipment are made of wood, or were constructed of wood in the past. For example, cricket bats are typically made of white willow. The baseball bats which are legal for use in Major League Baseball are frequently made of ash wood or hickory, and in recent years have been constructed from maple even though that wood is somewhat more fragile. National Basketball Association courts have been traditionally made out of parquetry.

Many other types of sports and recreation equipment, such as skis, ice hockey sticks, lacrosse sticks and archery bows, were commonly made of wood in the past, but have since been replaced with more modern materials such as aluminium, titanium or composite materials such as fiberglass and carbon fiber. One noteworthy example of this trend is the family of golf clubs commonly known as the woods, the heads of which were traditionally made of persimmon wood in the early days of the game of golf, but are now generally made of metal or (especially in the case of drivers) carbon-fiber composites.

Bacterial degradation
Little is known about the bacteria that degrade cellulose. Symbiotic bacteria in Xylophaga may play a role in the degradation of sunken wood. Alphaproteobacteria, Flavobacteria, Actinomycetota, Clostridia, and Bacteroidota have been detected in wood submerged for over a year.

See also

 Burl
 Carpentry
 Driftwood
 Dunnage
 Forestry
 List of woods
 Parquetry
 Pellet fuel
 Pulpwood
 Sawdust
 Thermally modified wood
 Tinder
 Wood-decay fungus
 Wood drying
 Wood economy
 Wood-plastic composite
 Wood preservation
 Wood warping
 Woodturning
 Woodworm
 Xylology
 Xylophagy
 Xylotheque
 Xylotomy

References

External links
 The Wood in Culture Association (archived 27 May 2016)
 The Wood Explorer: A comprehensive database of commercial wood species
 APA – The Engineered Wood Association (archived 14 April 2011)

 
Visual arts materials
Biodegradable materials
Building materials
Energy crops
Forestry
Natural materials
Trees
 
Woodworking materials
Materials
Natural resources
Botany
Wood products
Plant anatomy
Forest products